Willfred Nordlund  (born 18 April 1988) is a Norwegian politician. 
He was elected representative to the Storting for the period 2017–2021 for the Centre Party.

Storting committees

2017–2021 Member, Standing Committee on Local Government and Public Administration

Parliamentary delegations

2017–2021 Member, Delegation for Arctic Parliamentary Cooperation

References

1988 births
Living people
Centre Party (Norway) politicians
Members of the Storting
Nordland politicians
Politicians from Bodø
21st-century Norwegian politicians